The Metropolitan Yeshiva High School Athletic League (MYHSAL), or Yeshiva League, is a high school athletic league consisting of 36 Modern/Centrist Orthodox and two pluralist Yeshivas in the New York Metropolitan Area. It includes the sports of basketball, floor hockey, volleyball, soccer, baseball, tennis, and softball. The league, and particularly its sport of floor hockey, was described by the New York Times in a 2017 piece. Jared Kushner played hockey in the league while attending the Frisch School.

References

External links

Jewish sports organizations
Sports organizations of the United States
Sports in New York City